John G. Gorman is an Australian born physician and medical researcher. In 1980, Gorman shared the Lasker-DeBakey Clinical Medical Research Award for pioneering work on the rhesus blood group system, the role of rhesus D antibodies in the causation of Rh disease and the apparently paradoxical prevention of Rh disease using the Rh antibodies themselves, in the form of Rho(D) immune globulin, as treatment.

Since its discovery, Gorman's treatment is estimated to have saved millions of lives.

References

Further reading
 

Recipients of the Lasker-DeBakey Clinical Medical Research Award